Boris Savelyevich Rappoport (born 1 May 1946) is a Russian professional football coach and a former player. He is the assistant coach with FC Leningradets Leningrad Oblast.

External links
 

1946 births
Living people
Soviet footballers
Association football goalkeepers
FC Rotor Volgograd players
FK Köpetdag Aşgabat players
Russian football managers
FC Dynamo Saint Petersburg managers
FC Zenit Saint Petersburg managers
Russian Premier League managers
FC Dynamo Saint Petersburg players